The list of ship launches in 1753 includes a chronological list of some ships launched in 1753.


References

1753
Ship launches